Copper units of pressure or CUP, and the related lead units of pressure or LUP, are terms applied to pressure measurements used in the field of internal ballistics for the estimation of chamber pressures in firearms.  These terms were adopted by convention to indicate that the pressure values were measured by copper crusher and lead crusher gauges respectively.  In recent years, they have been replaced by the adoption of more modern piezoelectric pressure gauges that more accurately measure chamber pressures and generally give significantly higher pressure values.  This nomenclature was adopted to avoid confusion and the potentially dangerous interchange of pressure values and standards made by different types of pressure gauges. For example, it makes little sense to describe a maximum pressure as 300 MPa, and in case the pressure has been measured according to the CUP procedure it should be denoted as 300 MPa (CUP).

Pressure is a fundamental physical parameter that is expressed in units of force divided by area. The unit of pressure in the avoirdupois system is pound per square inch, while the unit of pressure in the metric system is the bar, and the unit of pressure in the modern SI system is pascal (equivalent to newton per square meter).  A chamber pressure measured with a copper crusher gauge would there be expressed in psi (CUP) in the British Imperial system and United States Customary system, bar (CUP) in the metric system, and MPa (CUP) in the SI system.

Methodology
Estimation of pressure using CUP and LUP units is performed by a special crusher gun, which uses pressure applied to a piston to crush a carefully manufactured and calibrated copper or lead cylinder.  The amount of deformation is compared to the amount of crushing produced by different pressures in pounds per square inch.  Copper cylinders are used at high pressures, such as are generated by most handgun and rifle cartridges, and lead cylinders are used for low pressures such as are generated by shotgun shells.  The crusher gun has a hole in the chamber that is linked to a piston, and upon firing, this piston is subjected to the pressure of firing.  The piston then acts on the calibrated cylinder, crushing it slightly.  The length of the crushed cylinder is measured and compared to a chart of lengths resulting from crushing cylinders with given amounts of pressure, and the corresponding force is the CUP or LUP pressure value.
The American standards organization Sporting Arms and Ammunition Manufacturers' Institute (SAAMI) published CUP pressure level standards for many cartridges.

Comparing units
While CUP and LUP numbers were intended to be comparable to the crushing power of a given pressure in psi (lbf/in2), the numbers are not equivalent.  Since a longer duration, lower pressure pulse can crush the cylinder as much as a shorter duration, higher pressure pulse, CUP and LUP pressures frequently register lower than actual peak pressures (as measured by a transducer) by up to 20%.  For example, the SAAMI maximum pressure for the 7.62×51mm is given as 52,000 psi (CUP), or 62,000 psi (430 MPa); the .45-70, on the other extreme, is listed as 28,000 in both CUP and psi (190 MPa).  SAAMI standards for a given cartridge may be expressed in CUP units, LUP units, or in standard units of pressure (psi or MPa).

Although no accurate conversion formulas are possible, for converting between true pressures and crusher indicated pressures, linearized approximation conversion equations do exist over narrow ranges of pressures for estimating piezo pressure readings given crusher pressures.

For example, Denton Bramwell has published a conversion approximation formula, covering only SAAMI crusher pressures between 28,000 and 54,000 CUP:

piezo = 1.52 × crusher − 18,000

Likewise, there is a conversion approximation formulas for estimating between CIP (European) crusher pressures (which are recorded in multiples of 50 bar) and piezo ratings, consistent with different assumptions for CIP vs. SAAMI crusher test conditions:

piezo = 1.21 × crusher − 2.8

In addition to these linear approximations, there also exist exponential conversion approximation formulas for estimating from about 0 to about 60 ksi crusher values to psi values, and these are sometimes used up to around 67 ksi, but with significantly increasing errors.

CUP and LUP pressures vs. transducer pressures
Until the invention of measurement transducers in the 1960s, crusher guns were the only reliable method for estimating chamber pressures.  With the availability of inexpensive, reliable transducers since the 1960s for actually making chamber pressure measurements, the industry almost universally has begun to move away from crusher guns for estimating  chamber pressures, towards favoring making actual measurements.  Transducers are also faster to use in practice, as they do not require the careful measuring of the copper or lead cylinders after firing.  Additionally, transducers are capable of recording instant-by-instant pressures through the entire firing cycle.  Hence, in the long run, using a transducer is less expensive, as it does not require using expendable metal cylinders in a crusher gun, and also reduces the labor required to analyze test results.

One outcome from this transition to using measurement transducers is, for example, that a Speer reloading manual from 1987 lists all SAAMI pressures in CUP, while current references list nearly all pressures in PSI.  Another outcome is that design margins are now better determined, which has the effect of increasing the long-term safety of firing multiple thousands of rounds in a gun.  With estimates based on crusher guns, actual safety margins could never be accurately assessed, short of actually firing tens of thousands of rounds in a sample gun.

References

External links
 Chamber Pressure Measurement by Terry Hart
 Chart of SAAMI pressure levels for common cartridges, in PSI or CUP.
 A study done that shows a statistically significant correlation between CUP and PSI for rifle cartridges.
 Speer Reloading Manual Number 11, Omark Industries, 1987 

Units of pressure